Joachim Jean-Marie Forget (born 15 April 1983), known as Joachim Son-Forget is a South Korean-born French politician. Holding a doctorate in neuroscience, he also works part-time as a radiologist in Switzerland. He has held Kosovar citizenship since 2018.

Adopted by a French family as a child, Son-Forget was previously active within the Socialist Party (PS), then liberal party La République En Marche! (LREM) until he resigned from the party in late 2018. He then founded his own political party Valeur Absolue, and since 2021 has been involved alongside far-right party Reconquête. Son-Forget has variously labeled himself a liberal, a right-winger, a supporter of the European Union and of French President Emmanuel Macron.

Since his election as a member of the National Assembly in 2017, Son-Forget has made multiple appearances in interviews and talk shows and is an active user of social media. On the Internet, his publishing of satirical content and memes drew attention from the press; his use of social media has been described as "trolling" by various media outlets, and has been the subject of controversy within French politics.

Biography

Early life

Born in South Korea, Joachim Son-Forget was adopted by a French family as a child and grew up in Langres, before studying in Dijon, Paris and Lausanne.

In 2005, he received a Master 2 in cognitive science from CogMaster (co-accredited by Paris Descartes University, EHESS and ENS Ulm) with cognitive psychologist Stanislas Dehaene. In 2008 he graduated at the end of the second cycle (Master 2) of medical studies at the University of Burgundy. In 2015, he obtained a doctorate MD-PhD in medicine and cognitive neuroscience. The subject of his thesis was "Visuo-vestibular mechanisms of bodily self-consciousness".

Political career

Son-Forget supported Socialist candidate François Hollande during the 2012 French presidential election. He was secretary of the Geneva section of the French Socialist Party within the Federation of French Abroad, and chairman of the committee of activists of the Party of European Socialists in Switzerland, before taking leave in 2014. In 2017, he joined then-presidential candidate Emmanuel Macron's political movement, "En Marche!" which later became La République En Marche (LREM).

2017 French legislative election
Son-Forget was the LREM candidate in the 2017 French legislative election for the sixth constituency for French residents overseas, which covers Switzerland and Liechtenstein. He progressed to the second round and defeated Republican candidate Claudine Schmid with 74.94% of the vote and 18.78% turnout.

Member of the National Assembly

As a member of the National Assembly, Son-Forget sat on the Foreign Affairs Committee and served as president of the France-South Korea Friendship Group and vice-president of the France-Kosovo Friendship Group. With La France Insoumise (LFI) member Jean-Luc Mélenchon, he co-wrote a report on France's strategy on seas and oceans.

In October 2018, he was a candidate in an internal election for Executive Officer of LREM, opposing fellow Member of Parliament Stanislas Guerini. He was defeated with 18% of the vote.

On 29 December 2018, Son-Forget resigned from both LREM and its parliamentary group amidst controversy on social networks and a spat with Green Senator Esther Benbassa. He declared he was still supporting President Macron.

On 31 December 2018, Son-Forget announced he would create his own political party, Je suis français et européen ("I am French and European") abbreviated as JSFee. The party was renamed in July 2019 as Valeur Absolue (which translates to "absolute value").

In January 2019, Son-Forget joined center-right parliamentary group UDI, Agir and Independents and left in December of that year. He sat as a Non-Attached member of the National Assembly for the remainder of his mandate.

2022 French elections

In February 2020, invited on talk show Touche pas à mon poste !, Son-Forget announced he would run for the 2022 French presidential election, introducing Alexandre Benalla (former deputy chief of staff to Emmanuel Macron) as one of his supporters. Previously, Son-Forget had attempted to have Benalla hired as his parliamentary assistant, but his application was rejected by the National Assembly. 

In 2021, Son-Forget began assisting and actively gathering support for far-right presidential candidate Éric Zemmour early in Zemmour's campaign. Son-Forget's change of political affiliation, from socialism to liberalism to the far-right, has been described as a singular path by some in the French media, and surprised personalities within LREM of which he used to be a member. In an interview on Sud Radio, Son-Forget insisted that neither he nor Zemmour were far-right, labeling himself as a conservative. After Zemmour was eliminated in the first round of the presidential election, Son-Forget endorsed candidate Emmanuel Macron ahead of the second round.

During the presidential campaign, Son-Forget had expressed his desire to run for the upcoming legislative election, representing Reconquête (the party founded by Zemmour). He eventually ran for re-election in his constituency as an independent candidate and was defeated in the first round with 4.5% of the vote.

Controversies
On 23 December 2018, through his Twitter account, Son-Forget called out Green Senator Esther Benbassa for her recent remarks on the yellow vests movement; additionally, Son-Forget made derogatory comments about Benbassa's makeup habits. The controversy that ensued prompted him to address "haters" through satirical statements and Internet memes. This behavior was criticized by fellow members of LREM; Executive Officer Stanislas Guerini announced the party would issue him a "warning letter". Son-Forget, who stated his intent was to go viral on social media using "cognitive psychology", refused to apologize, and later declared he was quitting the party.

In December 2019, Son-Forget published online a picture of him posing with nationalist politician Marion Maréchal, describing it as a "teaser". This move was condemned by Jean-Christophe Lagarde, president of parliamentary group UDI, Agir and Independents (UAI) of which Son-Forget had become a member; Lagarde explained that the values of the group were incompatible with nationalism. In response, Son-Forget resigned from UAI.

On 18 April 2020, Son-Forget's Twitter account was edited to impersonate president Emmanuel Macron and began posting messages of satirical nature. Son-Forget later changed his account back to normal, claiming that someone had been maliciously using his account. A similar incident happened in January 2021 after Twitter's permanent account suspension of Donald Trump, when Son-Forget edited his account to impersonate Trump; Twitter subsequently suspended Son-Forget's own account.

Personal life
Son-Forget currently lives in Switzerland with his two children and his second wife, a Korean national.

Son-Forget has reportedly been passionate about Kosovo since he was a teenager and was a Vice-President of the France-Kosovo relations group in the French National Assembly. In 2018, then-President of Kosovo Hashim Thaçi personally awarded Kosovar citizenship to Son-Forget.

Aside from his political and medical career, Son-Forget plays the harpsichord and practices long range shooting and various martial arts such as karate. In 2019, he recorded a song titled En Couleurs, featuring Doc Gynéco.

References

Notes

Citations

External links
 Joachim Son-Forget's website 
 Official page on the website of the French National Assembly 

1983 births
Living people
La République En Marche! politicians
Deputies of the 15th National Assembly of the French Fifth Republic
French radiologists
French politicians of Korean descent
South Korean emigrants to France
French adoptees
Socialist Party (France) politicians
Members of Parliament for French people living outside France